"Maximum Overdrive" is a song by Belgian-Dutch Eurodance band 2 Unlimited, released in November 1993 as the fourth single from their second album, No Limits! (1993). The UK release was the first UK single to maintain all the rap lyrics from Ray used in the European release. The song reached number 15 on the UK Singles Chart, and was also a number-one hit in Finland and on the European Dance Radio Chart by Music & Media.

Critical reception
In his weekly UK chart commentary, James Masterton stated, "In as much as it is possible to classify things like this, 2 Unlimited are the most successful dance act ever." In Pan-European magazine Music & Media'''s review of No Limits!, they viewed the song as a "potential single", "with a racing car breaking all speed limits." Alan Jones from Music Week commented, "He raps, she sings, the music ponds in typical pop/rave style...yes, the usual 2 Unlimited hallmarks are present and correct, though melodically this is perhaps the weakest single they've released yet. Even so, this will probably scrape into the Top 10." James Hamilton from the RM Dance Update described it as "typical rapped and chanted revving techno-pop". Alex Kadis from Smash Hits gave the song three out of five, writing that "it all hangs together in such a pleasant, catchy way that you're spirited to the record shop in a most unhesitant manner."

Chart performance
The release scored chart success in many European countries, topping the chart in Finland as well as Music & Medias European Dance Radio Chart. It peaked at number two in Portugal and Spain. And at number four in Belgium and number five in the Netherlands. On MTV's European Top 20, it reached number three. The single was also a top 20 hit in Austria (13), Denmark (14), Germany (16), Ireland (11), Sweden (18), and the UK. In the latter, it peaked at number 15 in its second week at the UK Singles Chart, on 21 November 1993. "Maximum Overdrive" stormed into the Eurochart Hot 100 on 28 November at number 19 and peaked three weeks later at number seven. Outside Europe, it made it to number 32 in Australia.

Airplay
"Maximum Overdrive" entered the European airplay chart Border Breakers at number 19 on 14 November 1993 following crossover airplay in North West-Europe. It peaked at number five on 18 December.

Music video
A music video was produced to promote "Maximum Overdrive", directed by British director David Betteridge. The concept of the video is a Wacky Races style chase with rivals on skateboards and pogo sticks. It was filmed in a warehouse in Northern London in the fall of 1993 and released on 8 November. The video received heavy rotation on MTV Europe and was A-listed on Germany's VIVA. In December 2013, it was also published on 2 Unlimited's official YouTube channel. As of December 2022, the video had generated more than 500,000 views. Betteridge had previously directed the videos for "Get Ready for This", "Twilight Zone", "Workaholic" and "The Magic Friend".

Track listings

 UK 7-inch single "Maximum Overdrive" (Radio edit without intro) – 3:21
 "Maximum Overdrive" (X-Out In-Trance) – 4:53

 Belgian 12-inch maxi "Maximum Overdrive" (extended) – 5:18
 "Maximum Overdrive" (album version) – 3:58
 "Maximum Overdrive" (Speedaumatic remix) – 5:45
 "Maximum Overdrive" (X-Out In Trance) – 4:53

 UK CD single "Maximum Overdrive" (radio edit without intro) – 3:28 
 "Maximum Overdrive" (extended) – 5:20
 "Maximum Overdrive" (Speedaumatic remix) – 5:45 
 "Maximum Overdrive" (X-Out In-Trance) – 4:51

 Australian CD maxi "Maximum Overdrive" (radio edit) – 3:43
 "Maximum Overdrive" (extended) – 5:18
 "Maximum Overdrive" (Speedaumatic remix) – 5:46
 "Maximum Overdrive" (X-Out In Trance) – 4:55

 Netherlands CD maxi'''
 "Maximum Overdrive" (radio edit) – 3:43
 "Maximum Overdrive" (extended) – 5:18
 "Maximum Overdrive" (album version) – 3:58
 "Maximum Overdrive" (Speedaumatic remix) – 5:45
 "Maximum Overdrive" (X-Out In Trance) – 4:53

Charts

Weekly charts

Year-end charts

References

1993 singles
1993 songs
2 Unlimited songs
Byte Records singles
English-language Dutch songs
Music videos directed by David Betteridge
Number-one singles in Finland
Number-one singles in Spain
Pete Waterman Entertainment singles
Songs written by Anita Doth
Songs written by Ray Slijngaard
Songs written by Phil Wilde
ZYX Music singles